Polyschisis tucumana is a species of beetle in the family Cerambycidae. It was described by Di Iorio in 2003.

References

Trachyderini
Beetles described in 2003